Matt Tobin (born June 5, 1990) is a former American football offensive tackle. He played college football at University of Iowa, and was signed by the Philadelphia Eagles as an undrafted free agent in 2013.

Early years
Matt Tobin went to school at St. Paul's elementary school in Worthington, IA.  After graduating in 6th grade, he attended Beckman Catholic High School in Dyersville, IA. Tobin did not start a game until his senior season in high school, in which he was selected to the second-team all-state. He was named to the first-team all-District and all-Area also in his senior season, in which he was named captain of all-Area squad.

College career
Tobin played college football as a walk on at University of Iowa, where he started his final 22 games.

Professional career

Philadelphia Eagles
On April 29, 2013, he signed with the Philadelphia Eagles as an undrafted free agent.

On December 12, 2016, Tobin was placed on injured reserve after suffering a knee injury in Week 14.

Seattle Seahawks
On August 21, 2017, Tobin was traded, along with the Eagles' 2018 seventh round pick, to the Seattle Seahawks in exchange for their 2018 fifth round pick.

New England Patriots 
On March 17, 2018, Tobin signed with the New England Patriots. On September 1, Tobin was released as part of the roster cutdown.

San Francisco 49ers
On September 3, 2018, Tobin signed a one year deal with the San Francisco 49ers. He was released on September 19, 2018.

New England Patriots (second stint) 
On November 7, 2018, Tobin was re-signed by the New England Patriots. On November 26, 2018, the Patriots waived Tobin.

References

External links
Iowa Hawkeyes bio
Philadelphia Eagles bio

1990 births
Living people
American football offensive tackles
American football offensive guards
Iowa Hawkeyes football players
Philadelphia Eagles players
Seattle Seahawks players
New England Patriots players
San Francisco 49ers players